The 1620 class was a class of diesel locomotives built by English Electric, Rocklea for Queensland Railways between 1967 and 1969.

The 1620 class locomotives are similar to the New Zealand Railways DI class, also built at the Rocklea works.

History
The 1620 class was an evolution of the 1600 class being fitted with a hood nose. They operated in Central and North Queensland as well as hauling commuter trains in Brisbane. The class was withdrawn in the mid 1990s with some sold to John Holland and exported to Malaysia and The Philippines.

1647 has been recently noted to still be in use with Lafarge cement at Padang Jawa, near Kuala Lumpur, Malaysia

Six have been preserved:
1620 retained as part of the Queensland Rail Heritage Fleet at the Workshops Rail Museum, North Ipswich, restored for main line operation
1632 leased to the Mary Valley Rattler, Gympie.
1639 leased to the Mary Valley Rattler, Gympie.
1649 leased to the Mary Valley Rattler, Gympie.
1650 by the Australian Railway Historical Society, stored at Redbank Railway Workshops
1651 at Redbank Workshops

Status table of preserved locomotives

References

External links
Rail Pictures gallery

Co-Co locomotives
Diesel locomotives of Queensland
English Electric locomotives
Queensland Rail locomotives
Railway locomotives introduced in 1967
Diesel-electric locomotives of Australia
3 ft 6 in gauge locomotives of Australia